mm² is a short form for square millimeter, an international unit of area.

Mm² is a short form for square megameter, also an international unit of area.

MM2 may refer to:
 MM2, a class of force fields; see force field (chemistry)
 MM2 (MMS), an interface utilized by the Multimedia Messaging Service standard
 Mega Man 2, a 1988 video game for the NES
 Mega Man II (Game Boy), a 1991 video game for the Game Boy
 Midtown Madness 2, a 2000 video game for the PC
 Motocross Madness 2, a 2000 video game for the PC
 Might and Magic II: Gates to Another World, a 1988 video game
 Metal Max 2, a 1993 video game for the SNES
 MM2 register, a CPU register used by the MMX extension
 Modigliani–Miller theorem (proposition 2), a theorem on capital structure
 Mario Maker 2, a 2019 video game for the Nintendo Switch
Murder Mystery 2, a Roblox experience
mm2 Entertainment, an Asian media production and distribution company